The IBM WorkPad z50 is a handheld PC that was marketed by IBM as part of the IBM WorkPad series. It runs on Windows CE.

History 
It was released in 1999 for a price of $999.

Specifications 
z50 is a subnotebook, weighing 1206 g, with up-to 8 hours battery life from its Li-ion battery. It uses MIPS 4100 CPU (NEC VR4121) at 131 MHz, and features 16 MiB RAM and ROM. It has a 640x480 display. WIRED noted that it bears similarity to the ThinkPad series.

It has been delivered with Windows CE. NetBSD is also compatible with the z50.

Reception 
PC Mag noted the great keyboard and large amount of RAM.

References

External links 

 Review
 mars.dti.ne.jp
 Z50 Impressions
 

Windows CE devices
IBM laptops
Computer-related introductions in 1999